The blacktail moray eel (Gymnothorax kolpos) is a moray eel found in the western Atlantic Ocean. It was first named by Böhlke and Böhlke in 1980.

References

blacktail moray
Fauna of the Southeastern United States
Fish of the Gulf of Mexico
blacktail moray